Main Roads Western Australia controls the major roads in the state's Pilbara region. There are two main highways in the region: Great Northern Highway, which travels north through the region to Port Hedland  and then north-west along the coast, as well as North West Coastal Highway, which heads south-west from Port Hedland. A series of main roads connects towns to the highways, and local roads provide additional links. The majority of these roads service the western half of the region, with few located in the various deserts east of the Oakover River. Roads are often named after the towns or areas they connect.

The region's main roads are important for multiple aspects of the Pilbara's economy. These activities include mining (despite most products being transported by rail), agriculture and pastoral leases, and tourism, especially to the national parks at Karijini, Millstream-Chichester, and Rudall River.

Bingarn Road

Bingarn Road is the main access road connecting Tom Price to the wider Pilbara region since 2020. It commences at the intersection of Manuwarra Red Dog Highway and Paraburdoo–Tom Price Road and terminates at the intersection of Willow and Central Roads in central Tom Price. It was originally known as Mine Road prior to the naming of the Manuwarra Red Dog Highway replacing the original Bingarn Road alignment. The original Bingarn Road was a major north–south road in the Pilbara connecting Tom Price north to Nanutarra Munjina Road at Mount Sheila..

Burrup Road

Burrup Road, also known as Burrup Peninsula Road, is a main road on the Burrup Peninsula. From Dampier Road near Dampier, it heads north-east up the peninsula to Woodside's onshore LNG processing plant.

Dampier Road

Dampier Road, also known as Dampier Highway, is a major road in the Pilbara. From De Witt Road in Karratha, it travels west along the southern edge of town, and continues west to Gap Ridge.  It then turns north-westerly, running to Dampier on the Burrup Peninsula.

The road was completed in the late 1960s as a major link between Karratha and Dampier.

Duplication between Balmoral Road West and Burrup Peninsula Road, turning the road into a dual carriageway, was completed on 28 February 2013.

Great Northern Highway

Great Northern Highway is a main highway through the Pilbara region, and part of the Perth to Darwin national highway. From the southern edge of the region at Newman, the highway travels north-west towards Karijini National Park, and then north to Port Hedland, where it meets the northern end of North West Coastal Highway. Great Northern Highway continues north-eastwards near the coast, passing into the Kimberley region at Pardoo.

De Witt Road

De Witt Road (formerly Karratha Rd) is a main north–south road in the Pilbara region, linking Karratha to the North West Coastal Highway. It travels from the highway to the town centre along the eastern edge of Stove Hill, terminating at Dampier Road.

Karijini Road

Karijini Road, also known as Karijini Drive, is a major east–west road through the Karijini National Park. It connects Great Northern Highway, on the eastern side of the park, to Mount Sheila, near Tom Price, west of the park.

Madigan Road

Madigan Road is a major north–south road in the Pilbara region. It runs north from the Karratha Roadhouse on North West Coastal Highway, linking traffic to Dampier and Karratha via Dampier Road.

Manuwarra Red Dog Highway

Manuwarra Red Dog Highway is a major north-west to south-east road in the Pilbara region currently being constructed between Karratha and Tom Price. Originally known as Karratha-Tom Price Road, it acquired its new name in September 2020 after community consultation. Manuwarra means "heaps" in the Yindjibarndi language and is the indigenous name for the Red Dog Gorge in the Millstream Chichester National Park. Both the gorge and the highway acquired its English name from the eponymous Red Dog, a famous Kelpie/Cattle Dog and Pilbara mascot from the 1970s.

The road is constructed from renamed sections of Warlu Road, Roebourne-Wittenoom Road and Bingarn Road along with a portion of the service road originally constructed to service the Hamersley & Robe River railway.

Marble Bar Road

Marble Bar Road is a main north–south road in the Pilbara region. From Great Northern Highway at Newman, it heads north via Nullagine and Marble Bar to rejoin Great Northern Highway at Strelley, east of Port Hedland. Although it provides an alternative route to Great Northern Highway, most of the Newman to Marble Bar section is unsealed. The Northern Australia Roads Program announced in 2016 included the following project for the Marble Bar Road.

Coongan Gorge
The project for realignment and reconstruction works was completed in mid 2019 at a total cost of $34.5 million.

Nanutarra Munjina Road

Nanutarra Munjina Road is a major east–west road in the Pilbara region. From North West Coastal Highway at the Nanutarra Roadhouse, it travels east-south-east towards Paraburdoo–Tom Price Road. The sealed road turns here towards Paraburdoo, but Nanutarra Munjina Road continues as an unsealed road for most of its remaining length. It curves to the north-east, heading around Tom Price and the Karijini National Park. Near the Fortescue River, the road again travels east-south-easterly to Great Northern Highway at the Auski Roadhouse, Karijini.

North West Coastal Highway

North West Coastal Highway is a highway that follows the southern half of the Pilbara coastline. From the Gascyone region at Burkett Road, a turnoff for Exmouth, the highway enters the Pilbara region at Yannarie. It heads north-easterly, gradually moving closer to the coast until it reaches the access roads to Dampier and Karratha, Madigan Road and Karratha Road. From here the highway moves runs to Roebourne and then over to Whim Creek, where it curves back to the north east to meet Great Northern Highway at Mundabullangana, south of Port Hedland.

Onslow Road

Onslow Road is a major road in the Pilbara region. From North West Coastal Highway at Cane, north of the Nanutarra Roadhouse, it heads north-west to the town of Onslow on the coast.

Paraburdoo–Tom Price Road

Paraburdoo–Tom Price Road, also known as Paraburdoo Tom Price Road or Paraburdoo Road (west of Paraburdoo) and Tom Price Road (east of Paraburdoo), is a major road in the Pilbara region. From Nanutarra Munjina Road in Rocklea, the road heads south-east to Paraburdoo. It then curves round to the north, meeting Karijini Road, before heading a short distance north-west to Tom Price, where Manuwarra Red Dog Highway completes the loop back to Nanutarra Munjina Road. Paraburdoo–Tom Price Road is part of the sealed road link between North West Coastal Highway and Great Northern Highway in the southern half of the Pilbara.

Point Samson–Roebourne Road

Point Samson–Roebourne Road, also known as Point Samson Roebourne Road, is a major north–south road in the Pilbara region. It links Point Samson on the coast via Wickham to North West Coastal Highway at Roebourne.

Ripon Hills Road

Ripon Hills Road is a major east–west road in Marble Bar. It travels from Marble Bar Road near the Marble Bar townsite to the Telfer Mine Road turnoff, near the Oakover River, which provides access to Telfer. After the turnoff, Ripon Hills Road continues as Woodie Woodie Road to the Nifty and Woodie Woodie mine sites.

Ripon Hills Road was opened in November 1999 to replace the unsealed Woodie Woodie Road between Marble Bar townsite and the Telfer Mine Road turnoff as the main road through the region. At the time Ripon Hills Road was opened, Woodie Woodie Road carried over 500 Thousand tonnes of freight.

Wilson Street

Wilson Street is a major road in Port Hedland, in the Pilbara region. It connects the coastal townsite to Great Northern Highway.

See also

 List of highways in Western Australia
 List of road routes in Western Australia
 List of major roads in rural Western Australia
 Major roads in the Gascoyne region of Western Australia
 Major roads in the Kimberley region of Western Australia
 Major roads in the Mid West region of Western Australia
 Major roads in the Wheatbelt region of Western Australia
 Tourist Drives in Western Australia

References

.
Pilbara